Inherit the Wind  is a 1988 American legal drama television film directed by David Greene and written by John Gay, based on the 1955 play of the same name by Jerome Lawrence and Robert E. Lee. The film stars Kirk Douglas, Jason Robards, Darren McGavin and Jean Simmons. It aired on NBC on March 20, 1988.

The original play was written as a parable which fictionalized the 1925 Scopes "Monkey" Trial as a means of discussing the 1950s McCarthy trials. This version differed from the two previous films by attempting to make Brady more sympathetic and the storyline (according to its producers) "a bit more fair to both sides."

When announced in early 1987, the film was to co-star Douglas and Gregory Peck, under the title The Monkey Trial.

Plot summary

Cast 
 Jason Robards as Henry Drummond
 Kirk Douglas as Matthew Harrison Brady
 Darren McGavin as E. K. Hornbeck
 Jean Simmons as Lucy Brady
 Kyle Secor as Bertram Cates
 Michael Ensign as Rev. Brown
 Megan Follows as Rachel Brown

Awards
Emmy Awards
 Won: Outstanding Drama/Comedy Special - Peter Douglas (executive producer) and Robert Papazian (producer)
 Won: Outstanding Lead Actor in a Miniseries or a Special - Jason Robards
Nominated: Outstanding Cinematography for a Miniseries or a Special - Stevan Larner

See also 

 List of American films of 1988
 Trial movies

Notes

External links and references
 
 
 

1988 films
1988 drama films
1980s American films
1980s English-language films
1980s legal drama films
Films about religion
American courtroom films
American drama television films
American films based on actual events
American films based on plays
American legal drama films
Cultural depictions of Clarence Darrow
Cultural depictions of John T. Scopes
Drama films based on actual events
Films à clef
Films about lawyers
Films directed by David Greene
Films scored by Arthur B. Rubinstein
Films shot in Oregon
Films with screenplays by John Gay (screenwriter)
NBC network original films
Primetime Emmy Award for Outstanding Made for Television Movie winners
Scopes Trial
Television films based on actual events
United Artists films